How to Sell Drugs Online (Fast) is a German coming-of-age dark humor crime streaming television series co-created by Philipp Käßbohrer and Matthias Murmann. The first season, consisting of six episodes, was released on 31 May 2019, on Netflix. The series stars Maximilian Mundt, Anna Lena Klenke, Danilo Kamperidis, Damian Hardung, Luna Baptiste Schaller, Leonie Wesselow and Bjarne Mädel. The second season premiered on Netflix on 21 July 2020. On 28 July 2020, Netflix renewed the series for a third season. It premiered on July 27, 2021. On 12 August 2022, for dwdl.de, creators Matthias Murmann and Philipp Käßbohrer said in an interview that Netflix gave the green light for a fourth season.

Overview
How to Sell Drugs Online (Fast) is set in fictional Rinseln, North Rhine-Westphalia, Germany, and told from the perspective of high-school outcast and nerd Moritz Zimmermann. The series follows Moritz and his friend Lenny Sander attempting to rekindle Moritz's love for ex-girlfriend Lisa Novak, through selling ecstasy online. Starting off as a small time business, it quickly spirals out of control and Moritz and Lenny learn to deal with the consequences of large scale drug trafficking.

The series is inspired by a true story that took place in Leipzig in 2015. Maximilian Schmidt, the inspiration for the television series, was sentenced to seven years in prison.

Cast and characters
 Maximilian Mundt as Moritz Zimmerman, a nerdy high school student and CEO of MyDrugs. His desire for power and control from MyDrugs causes as many failures for the group as successes. He acts as the main narrator throughout the series, telling his story from within prison.
 Anna Lena Klenke as Lisa Novak, Moritz's ex-girlfriend. Her liking for ecstasy is the main catalyst in Moritz's plans to take her back.
 Danilo Kamperidis as Lenny Sander, Moritz's best friend. An adept hacker and video game junkie, he becomes the CTO of MyDrugs. He is a wheelchair user as a result of osteosarcoma.
 Damian Hardung as Daniel Riffert, Lisa's presumptive boyfriend and typical high-school jock. Whilst a rival to Moritz early on, he later becomes part of MyDrugs. 
 Luna Baptiste Schaller as Gerda Schwerdfeger, one of Lisa's friends at school, who takes a liking to Moritz.
 Leonie Wesselow as Fritzi Neuhaus, another one of Lisa's friends.
 Bjarne Mädel as Jakob 'Buba' Otto (season 1), a small-time drug dealer who is the main source of ecstasy in Rinseln. He owns a local farm which is the centre of the Albanian gang present in Rinseln.
 Roland Riebeling as Jens Zimmermann, Moritz's father and a police officer. He is part of the investigation in stopping the drug situation in Rinseln and later on, MyDrugs.
 Jolina Amely Trinks as Marie Zimmermann, Moritz's younger sister. The more social of the Zimmermann family, she has a moderate size following on Instagram. She is also an avid horse rider, riding at the stables owned by the Albanian gang.
 Jonathan Frakes as Himself, reprising his part as host of the show Beyond Belief: Fact or Fiction
 Lena Urzendowsky as Milena 'Kira' Bechtholz (season 2–), Lenny's online girlfriend. In Season 2, she becomes part of Lenny's life and becomes infatuated with MyDrugs.
 Maren Kroymann as Doro Otto (season 2-), Buba's mother and leader of the Albanian gang.
 Langston Uibel as Joseph Kammerlander (season 3)
 Erik Range, AKA Gronkh, as himself, a YouTuber in Season 3 Episode 3, playing Animal Crossing.

Episodes

Season 1 (2019)

Season 2 (2020)

Season 3 (2021)

Production

Development
On 25 October 2018, it was announced that Netflix had given the production a series order for a six-episode first season. The series is created by Philipp Käßbohrer and Matthias Murmann who will be credited as executive producers. Production companies involved with the series were slated to consist of bildundtonfabrik. On July 9, 2019, the series was renewed by Netflix for a second season, which was released on 21 July 2020. On 28 July 2020, Netflix renewed the series for a third season, which premiered on 27 July 2021.

Casting
Alongside the series order announcement, it was confirmed that Maximilian Mundt, Anna Lena Klenke, Danilo Kamperidis, Damian Hardung, Luna Baptiste Schaller, Leonie Wesselow and Bjarne Mädel would star in the series. In June 2020, Lena Urzendowsky was cast in the role of Kira on the second season. On 28 July 2020, Langston Uibel was announced to have joined the third season's new main cast.

Filming
On 17 December 2018, Netflix announced that filming for the first season was completed. Principal photography for the second season took place on location in Bonn, Germany in 2019. Filming for the third season took place on location in Cologne, Germany in 2020.

Premiere
On 6 April 2019, the series held its official premiere with the screening of the first two episodes at the Cannes International Series Festival in Cannes, France.

Release

Marketing 
On 6 April 2019, the teaser trailer for the series was released. On 17 May 2019, the official trailer for the series was released by Netflix. On 23 June 2020, the official trailer for the second season was released.
On 6 July 2021, the official trailer for the third season was released.

Spin-offs 
On August 3, 2022, Netflix released Buba, a spin-off film for the character of the same name.

References

External links
 
 

2010s comedy-drama television series
2010s German television series
2010s black comedy television series
2010s high school television series
2019 German television series debuts
2020s comedy-drama television series
2020s German television series
2020s high school television series
2020s black comedy television series
Cultural depictions of chemists
German comedy-drama television series
German-language Netflix original programming
Grimme-Preis for fiction winners
Television series about teenagers
Television series about illegal drug trade
Television shows set in North Rhine-Westphalia